Mette Ove-Petersen (born 15 January 1934) is a retired Danish swimmer who won a silver medal at the 1950 European Aquatics Championships in the 4 × 100 m freestyle relay. She finished fourth in the same event at the 1952 Summer Olympics; individually, she was eliminated in the preliminaries of the 100 m and 400 m freestyle.

References

1934 births
Danish female swimmers
Swimmers at the 1952 Summer Olympics
Danish female freestyle swimmers
Olympic swimmers of Denmark
Living people
European Aquatics Championships medalists in swimming
Swimmers from Copenhagen